Basil Mason was a British screenwriter. He worked on more than thirty films during his career.

Filmography
 Ebb Tide (1932)
 Women Who Play (1932)
 Aren't We All? (1932)
 Insult (1932)
 Puppets of Fate (1933)
 The Jewel (1933)
 Lucky Loser (1934)
 Brides to Be (1934)
 The Primrose Path (1934)
 Girls Please! (1934)
 Easy Money (1934)
 The Scoop (1934)
 Death at Broadcasting House (1934)
 The Price of Wisdom (1935)
 Key to Harmony (1935)
 Once a Thief (1935)
 The Silent Passenger (1935)
 Checkmate (1935)
 Gentlemen's Agreement (1935)
 Calling the Tune (1936)
 The House of the Spaniard (1936)
 Wake Up Famous (1937)
 Secret Lives (1937)
 The Lilac Domino (1937)
 Brief Ecstasy (1937)
 Paid in Error (1938)
 If I Were Boss (1938)
 Crackerjack (1938)
 What a Man! (1938)
 Candles at Nine (1944)
 Teheran (1946)
 White Cradle Inn (1947)
 Call of the Blood (1947)

References

Bibliography
 Goble, Alan. The Complete Index to Literary Sources in Film. Walter de Gruyter, 1999.

External links

Year of birth unknown
Year of death unknown
British screenwriters